Cryptantha subcapitata is a species of flowering plant in the borage family known by the common names Owl Creek miner's candle, Wallowa cat's eye, and Wallowa cryptantha. It is endemic to Wyoming in the United States, where it is limited to the Owl Creek and Bridger Mountains in Fremont County. There are three populations, with a total of about 38,000 individuals.

This plant is a perennial herb forming a low silvery mat of hairy leaves. The stems are up to 15 centimeters tall. It blooms in "sparkling white forget-me-not flowers."

This plant grows on barren, sandy and gravelly terrain on the Wind River Formation in the Wind River Basin. It grows on sandstone and limestone substrates. It occurs with other cushion-like plants such as Sphaeromeria capitata and Artemisia nova within sagebrush habitat. There are few threats to the species because the region is rugged and uninhabited.

References

External links
USDA Plants Profile

subcapitata
Flora of Wyoming
Fremont County, Wyoming
Plants described in 1981